Donovan James Rose (born March 9, 1957) is a former American and Canadian football defensive back in the National Football League and Canadian Football League. He was the head coach of the Hampton Pirates from 2009 to 2013. He played college football at Hampton and played for the Kansas City Chiefs and Miami Dolphins of the NFL and the Toronto Argonauts, Winnipeg Blue Bombers and Hamilton Tiger-Cats of the CFL.

References

1957 births
Living people
American football defensive backs
Canadian football defensive backs
Hamilton Tiger-Cats players
Hampton Pirates football coaches
Hampton Pirates football players
Kansas City Chiefs players
Miami Dolphins players
Toronto Argonauts players
Winnipeg Blue Bombers players
Players of Canadian football from Norfolk, Virginia
Players of American football from Norfolk, Virginia
African-American coaches of American football
African-American players of American football
African-American players of Canadian football
21st-century African-American people
20th-century African-American sportspeople